The following is a list of notable deaths in April 2003.

Entries for each day are listed alphabetically by surname. A typical entry lists information in the following sequence:
 Name, age, country of citizenship at birth, subsequent country of citizenship (if applicable), reason for notability, cause of death (if known), and reference.

April 2003

1
Booker Bradshaw, 61, American record producer, film & TV actor; Motown executive, heart attack.
Lloyd L. Brown, 89, American writer, activist and labor organizer, co-wrote Paul Robeson biography Here I Stand.
Richard Caddel, 53, English poet, publisher and editor, a key figure in the British Poetry Revival.
Leslie Cheung, 46, Hong Kong actor and singer.
Sven Holmberg, 85, Swedish actor.
David Horrobin, 63, British medical researcher and entrepreneur.
Adriaan Cornelis Zaanen, 89, Dutch mathematician, known for his books on Riesz spaces.

2
Hilly Flitcraft, 79, American baseball player (Philadelphia Phillies).
Paul Freeman, 59, American Bigfoot hunter.
Terenci Moix, 61, Spanish writer.
Ron Sceney, 85, Australian rules footballer.
Edwin Starr, 61, American soul singer.
Michael Wayne, 68, American film producer, eldest son of John Wayne, heart failure from complications of lupus.

3
Walter Ashbaugh, 84, American Olympic triple jumper (men's triple jump at the 1952 Summer Olympics).
Homer Banks, 61, American songwriter and record producer ("(If Loving You Is Wrong) I Don't Want to Be Right"), cancer.
Arthur Guyton, 83, American physiologist.
Scott Hain, 32, American convict, execution by lethal injection.
Hugh W. Hardy, 78, US Marine Corps Reserves major general.
Gunadasa Kapuge, 57, Sri Lankan musician, fall.
Harold S. Sawyer, 83, American politician (U.S. Representative for Michigan's 5th congressional district from 1977 to 1985), throat cancer .

4
Anthony Caruso, 86, American actor.
Fred J. Cook, 92, American investigative journalist.
Abdul Kadir, 54, Indonesian footballer, kidney failure.
Michael Kelly, 46, American journalist, columnist and magazine editor, war-related vehicular accident.
Helmut Knochen, 93, Nazi official and senior commander of the SiPo and SD.
Billy McPhail, 75, Scottish football player.
José Menéndez Monroig, 85, Puerto Rican politician.
J. Quigg Newton, 91, American lawyer and politician, mayor of Denver from 1947 to 1955.
Resortes, 87, Mexican comedian,  emphysema.
Paul Ray Smith, 33, US Army Sergeant, killed in action.

5
Seymour Lubetzky, 104, American cataloging theorist and librarian.
Frédéric Kibassa Maliba, 63, Democratic Republic of the Congo (DRC) politician, heart attack.
Beti Rhys, 96, Welsh bookseller and author.

6
David Bloom, 39, American television journalist (NBC News, Weekend Today), pulmonary embolism.
Anita Borg, 54, American computer scientist, advocate for the advancement of women in computer science.
Gerald Emmett Carter, 91, Canadian Roman Catholic prelate, Archbishop of Toronto (1978-1990).
Aleksandr Fatyushin, 52, Russian actor, pneumonia.
Leon Levy, 77, American investor, fund manager, and philanthropist.
Lance Corporal Ian Malone, 28, Irish soldier in the British Army, killed in action.
Babatunde Olatunji, 75, African drummer; recorded Drums of Passion, diabetes.
Dino Yannopoulos, 83, Greek-American stage director, (Metropolitan Opera, Academy of Vocal Arts, Athens Music Festival).

7
Julio Anguita Parrado, 32, Spanish journalist and war correspondent (El Mundo).
Cécile de Brunhoff, 99, French pianist and teacher, created the children's book character Babar the Elephant.
Ib Eisner, 77, Danish artist.
David Greene, 82, British television and film director, pancreatic cancer.
Jutta Hipp, 78, Germen-American jazz pianist and composer, pancreatic cancer.
Maurice Kouandété, 70, Benin military officer and politician.
Mohammad Khan Majeedi, 85, Indian poet.
Robin Winks, 72, American professor, historian, prolific author and diplomat.

8
Tareq Ayyoub, 35, Jordanian journalist for Al Jazeera, missile strike.
Pamela Bowden, 77, English contralto, teacher and administrator.
Kathie Browne, 72, American film and television actress (Perry Mason, Gunsmoke, Star Trek, The Love Boat).
Basil Greenhill, 83, British diplomat, museum director and historian.
Franz Rosenthal, 88, German-American professor of Semitic languages.
Bing Russell, 76, American actor and baseball club owner.

9
Jerry Bittle, 53, American editorial cartoonist and comic strip writer (Geech, Shirley and Son).
Earl Bramblett, 61, American mass murderer, execution by electrocution.
Alfred Campanelli, 77, American Chicago-area home builder.
Ken McKenzie, 79, Canadian sports journalist.
Ray Murray, 85, American baseball player (Cleveland Indians, Philadelphia Athletics, Baltimore Orioles).
James Earl Salisbury, 51, American educator, SARS.
Robert Wallace Wilkins, 96, American medical researcher, made contributions in the research of hypertension and cardiovascular disease.
Vera Zorina, 86, Norwegian ballerina, actress and choreographer (The Goldwyn Follies, Star Spangled Rhythm).

10
Abdul-Majid al-Khoei, 40, Shia cleric, stabbed.
Little Eva, (née Eva Narcissus Boyd), 59, American pop singer (The Loco-Motion).
Maurice F. Neufeld, 92, American academic, author, union organizer and labor relations consultant.
Franco Valle, 63, Italian boxer (bronze medal in middleweight boxing at the 1964 Summer Olympics).
Abraham Zabludovsky, 78, Mexican modernist architect (Rufino Tamayo Museum, National Auditorium).

11
Vasyl Barka, 94, Ukrainian-American poet, writer, literary critic and translator.
John Butler, 56, American professional football general manager (Buffalo Bills, San Diego Chargers).
Cecil H. Green, 102, Texas Instruments founder.
Peter Lloyd, 95, British mountaineer and engineer.
Brian Nelson, 55, Northern Irish paramilitary intelligence chief and clandestine agent, implicated in sectarian murders.

12
Clarence W. Blount, 81, American educator and politician, 31 years in Maryland State Senate.
John Robert Boker Jr., 90, American philatelist, named the outstanding philatelist of the last half of the twentieth century.
Sir Donald Harrison, 78, British surgeon.
Sydney Lassick, 80, American film actor (One Flew Over the Cuckoo's Nest), complications of diabetes.
Chalom Messas, 94, Chief Rabbi of Morocco and of Jerusalem, Israel.

13
Farouk Afero, 63, Pakistani-born Indonesian film actor, cancer.
Sean Delaney, 58, American musician.
Allen Eager, 76, American jazz tenor and alto saxophonist, liver cancer.
Majid bin Abdulaziz Al Saud, 64, member of House of Saud.
Elder Tadej Štrbulović, 88, Serbian Orthodox elder and  author.

14
G. Duncan Bauman, 91, American newspaper publisher (St. Louis Globe-Democrat from 1967 to 1984).
Pierre Blondiaux, 81, French rower (silver medal in men's coxless four at the 1952 Summer Olympics).
Al Epperly, 84, American baseball player (Chicago Cubs, Brooklyn Dodgers).
Bob Evans, 82, Welsh rugby player.
Kent Pullen, 60, American politician.

15
Betty Baskcomb, 88, British actress (Everything in the Garden, Afternoon of a Nymph, Doctor on the Go).
Sherwood Brewer, 79, American Negro league baseball player, four-time East-West All-Star: 1949, 1950, 1951, 1953.
Don Bunce, 54, American football quarterback (Stanford, 1972 Rose Bowl MVP) and orthopedic surgeon, heart attack.
Reg Bundy, 56, British dancer, actor and television presenter, cancer.
Roald Åsmund Bye, 74, Norwegian politician.
Erin Fleming, 61, Canadian actress.
Theodore Weiss, 86, American poet, professor and literary magazine editor.

16
Timothy I. Ahern, 78, American U.S. Air Force major general.
Jock Hamilton-Baillie, 84, British Royal Engineers officer.
Graham Jarvis, 72, Canadian actor in American films and television, multiple myeloma.
Samuel J. LeFrak, 85, American real estate tycoon.
Ray Mendoza, 73, Mexican professional wrestler.
Danny O'Dea, 91, British actor.
Richard B. Sewall, 95, American professor of English and writer.
Jewell Young, 90, American professional basketball player (Purdue University, Indianapolis Kautskys, Oshkosh All-Stars).

17
Robert Atkins, 72, American nutritionist (Atkins Diet).
H. B. Bailey, 66, American NASCAR driver.
John Paul Getty, Jr., 70, philanthropist, chest infection.
Sammy Kean, 85, Scottish football player and manager.
Earl King, 69, R&B musician/songwriter, complications of diabetes.
Jozef Schell, 67, Belgian biologist.
Graham Stuart Thomas, 94, British horticultural artist, author and garden designer.
Peter Cathcart Wason, 78, British cognitive psychologist, credited with founding the study of the psychology of reasoning.
Sergei Yushenkov, 52, Russian politician, member of Russian Parliament and outspoken critic of President Vladimir Putin.

18
Rudolf Brunnenmeier, 62, German football player, alcohol-related issues.
Edgar F. Codd, 79, English computer pioneer, heart failure.
Jean Drucker, 61, French Television executive, heart attack.
Toni Hagen, 85, Swiss geologist.
Toby MacDiarmid, 77, Australian politician.
Lefty Sloat, 84, American baseball player (Brooklyn Dodgers, Chicago Cubs).
Evlynn Smith, 40, Scottish artist, designer and furniture maker, brain aneurysm.

19
Mirza Tahir Ahmad, 74, Pakistani spiritual leader of the Ahmadiyya Muslim movement, Khalifatul Masih IV.
Cholly Atkins, 89, American dancer and choreographer, partnered with Charles Coles at Cotton Club and Apollo Theater.
Nazeh Darwazi, Palestinian freelance cameraman, gunshot wound.
Conrad Leonard, 104, British musician and composer.
Chris Zachary, 59, American baseball player (Houston Colt .45s / Astros, St. Louis Cardinals, Detroit Tigers).

20
Debbie Barham, 26, English comedy writer, wrote for comedians: Clive Anderson, Rory Bremner, Angus Deayton.
Jim Bartels, 57, American Hawaiian historian and museum curator, managing director of 'Iolani Palace.
Johnny Douglas, 82, English musician.
Teddy Edwards, 78, American jazz tenor saxophonist, prostate cancer.
Ruth Hale, 94, American playwright and actress.
Daijiro Kato, 26, Japanese motorcycle rider, after crashing at Suzuka on April 6.
Bernard Katz, 92, German-British Nobel Prize-winning biophysicist.
Cole Weston, 84, American photographer.

21
Robert Blackburn, 82, American artist and printmaker, one of America's foremost fine art lithographers.
Robert Elmer Kleason, 68, American convict, heart failure.
Nina Simone, 70, American jazz singer, long-based in France (known as the "High Priestess of Soul").
Raymond Henry Weill, 89, American philatelic dealer, one of the world's most famous stamp dealers.

22
Felice Bryant, 77, American songwriter ("Bye Bye Love", "Wake Up Little Susie", "Raining in My Heart").
Juan Rodriguez Chavez, 34, American serial killer, execution by lethal injection.
James H. Critchfield, 86, American CIA operative during the Cold War, pancreatic cancer.
Omana Gopalakrishnan, 66, Indian translator.
Martha Griffiths, 91, Congresswoman; women's rights activist.
Berkeley Smith, 84, British broadcaster.

23
Sidney Shlenker, 66, American businessman, heart failure.
Hansgeorg Bätcher, 89, German decorated Luftwaffe bomber ace during World War II.
Abram Bergson, 89, American economist, known as the dean of Soviet economic studies.
Jim Browne, 72, American professional basketball player (Chicago Stags, Denver Nuggets).
Fernand Fonssagrives, 93, French photographer.
Ian Marshall, 60, Scottish-born New Zealand football coach.
Guy Mountfort, 97, British advertising executive and ornithologist.
Larry Ochs, 80, American politician, pulmonary fibrosis.
Sidney Shlenker, 66, American businessman, heart failure.

24
Colin Bell, 61, English sociologist and university administrator.
Harold Levitt, 81, American architect.
Willie Moore, 71, Irish hurler.
Gino Orlando, 73, Brazilian footballer, cardiac arrest.
Belus Smawley, 85, American basketball player (Appalachian State, St. Louis Bombers, Baltimore Bullets) and coach.
Fuzz White, 86, American baseball player (St. Louis Browns, New York Giants).

25
Viktor Bushuev, 69, Soviet weightlifter (gold medal in men's lightweight weightlifting at the 1960 Summer Olympics).
Lynn Chadwick, 88, English sculptor and artist.
Bastiampillai Deogupillai, 86, Ceylon Tamil priest and Roman Catholic Bishop.
Dick Moore, 87, British Royal Naval officer and recipient of the  George Cross.
Jaime Silva Gómez, 67, Colombian footballer.
André Perraudin, 88, Swiss Catholic clergyman.
Francis Alexander Shields, 61, American businessman, prostate cancer.
Frank Wright, 64, American historian of southern Nevada.

26
Bernhard Baier, 90, German water polo player (silver medal in men's water polo at the 1936 Summer Olympics).
Rosemary Brown, 72, Canadian politician (NDP); first black woman elected to a provincial legislature, myocardial infarction.
David Lavender, 93, American historian and writer.
Danny Napoleon, 61, American baseball player (New York Mets).
Edward Max Nicholson, 98, British environmentalist, a founder of the World Wildlife Fund.
Peter Stone, 73, American screenwriter (Charade, Father Goose, 1776), Oscar and Tony-winner, pulmonary fibrosis.
Anne Von Bertouch, 84, Australian author, gallery director and art supporter.

27
Elaine Anderson Steinbeck, 88, American actress and Broadway stage manager, wife of John Steinbeck.
Edward Gaylord, 83, American businessman, media mogul and philanthropist, cancer.
Eddie Loyden, 79, British politician.
Dorothee Sölle, 73, German liberation theologian.
Wenzu Vella, 79, Maltese sports shooter (men's trap at the 1960 Summer Olympics).

28
Johnny Griffith, 78, American football player and coach (Georgia).
Barry Harper, 64, Australian sportsman, cancer.
Ciccio Ingrassia, 80, Italian actor, comedian and film director.
André Muhirwa, Burundian politician and Prime Minister.
Etti Plesch, 89, Austro-Hungarian countess and socialite.

29
Ron Barclay, 88, New Zealand politician (member of New Zealand Parliament for New Plymouth).
Janko Bobetko, 84, Croatian general, hailed as a hero of Croatia but charged with war crimes by the U.N.
David M. Brewer, 44, American convict, execution by lethal injection.
Angus Campbell-Gray, 71, British hereditary peer (House of Lords 1946–1999).
Frank Weston, 67, British Bishop of Knaresborough.
Jerry Williams, 79, American radio host, a pioneer of talk radio.

30
Jennifer d'Abo, 57, British entrepreneur (Ryman).
Gbenga Adeboye, 43, Nigerian singer, comedian and radio host, kidney-related diseases.
Ferdinand P. Beer, 87, French-American mechanical engineer and university professor, wrote widely used mechanics textbooks.
Mark Berger, 47, American economist, professor and researcher (Center for Business and Economic Research).
Peter 'Possum' Bourne, 47, New Zealand 3-time Asia-Pacific Rally champion, head injuries sustained in a car crash.
Lionel Wilson, 79, American voice actor, audiobook reader and children's book author, pneumonia.

References 

2003-04
 04